The Assembly of the People United–Democratic Party of Guinea-Bissau (APU-PDGB) is a political party in Guinea-Bissau.

History
The party was established in November 2014 by Nuno Gomes Nabiam following the April–May 2014 general elections, in which he was runner-up in the presidential contest. Prior to the 2019 parliamentary elections the party signed a coalition agreement with the African Party for the Independence of Guinea and Cape Verde. It went on to receive 8.5% of the vote and won five seats in the National People's Assembly.

References

External links
Official website 

Political parties in Guinea-Bissau
2014 establishments in Guinea-Bissau
Political parties established in 2014